The Aberto de Tênis do Rio Grande do Sul is a defunct tennis tournament held in Porto Alegre, Brazil since 2012. The event has been part of the ATP Challenger Tour from 2012 until 2015 and was played on clay courts.

Past finals

Singles

Doubles

References

External links
Official website

 
ATP Challenger Tour
Clay court tennis tournaments
Tennis tournaments in Brazil